The Guildhall is a municipal building in High Street, Newcastle-under-Lyme. It is a Grade II listed building.

History
The building was commissioned to replace an earlier guildhall located just to the north of the current building. The new guildhall, which was initially a rectangular red brick building with arches on the ground floor, was completed in November 1713. It was altered by erecting a clock tower on the roof in 1830 and by bricking up the arches on the ground floor in 1861.

Although facilities for council officers were established in Ironmarket in 1890, the upper floor of the guildhall continued to be the meeting place of Newcastle-under-Lyme Borough Council. Monthly meetings of Newcastle Trades Council took place in the guildhall and it also served as a courtroom for the Newcastle Quarter Sessions. The council was accused of "selling off the family silver" when the guildhall was converted for use as a public house in 1999.

The guildhall fell into a state of disrepair before being refurbished in the early years of the 21st century and re-opening as a customer service centre in December 2008. However the guildhall fell vacant after the customer service staff relocated to Castle House in Barracks Road in 2018. It then became a community hub operated by "Support Staffordshire".

Gallery

See also
Listed buildings in Newcastle-under-Lyme

Notes

References

City and town halls in Staffordshire
Buildings and structures in Staffordshire
Grade II listed buildings in Staffordshire
Newcastle-under-Lyme
Government buildings completed in 1713